Oriyur is a small village in Ariyalur taluk, Ariyalur district, Tamil Nadu, India. As of the 2011 Census of India, the village had a population of 1,703 across 464 households. There were 868 males and 838 females.

References 

Villages in Ariyalur district